Charnawati Khola Hydroelectric Project is a run-of-the-river hydroelectric power station with an installed capacity of 3.52 MW. This power station is located in Dolakha District, Nepal.  The flow is 2.19 m3/s and gross head is 199 m. The annual generation of energy is 20.383 GWh. The electricity is connected to Makaibari (Gaighat) substation of NEA via 11 km long 33kV transmission line.

The plant is operated by Nepal Hydro Developer Limited, a public company developing various hydropower projects in Nepal.

References

Hydroelectric power stations in Nepal
Run-of-the-river power stations

Energy infrastructure completed in 2015
Buildings and structures in Dolakha District
2015 establishments in Nepal